Eucorydia is a genus of cockroaches. Species are found in Asia. They are characterized by a metallic greenish-bluish pronotum and sometimes orange markings on the tegmina and/or abdomen.

Species list 
Eucorydia has 23 species since 2021.
 Eucorydia aenea (Brunner von Wattenwyl, 1865)
 Eucorydia asahinai Yanagisawa et al., 2021 
 Eucorydia coerulea (Shelford 1906)
 Eucorydia dasytoides (Walker, 1868)
 Eucorydia donanensis Yanagisawa, Sakamaki &Shimano, 2021
 Eucorydia forceps (Hanitsch 1915)
 Eucorydia gemma Hebard 1929
 Eucorydia guilinensis Qiu, Che, & Wang, 2017
 Eucorydia hilaris (Kirby, W. F. 1903)
 Eucorydia linglong Qiu, Che, & Wang, 2017
 Eucorydia maxwelli (Hanitsch, 1915)
 Eucorydia miyakoensis Yanagisawa, Sakamaki &Shimano, 2021
 Eucorydia multimaculata Bruijning 1948
 Eucorydia ornata (Saussure 1864)
 Eucorydia pilosa Qiu, Che, & Wang, 2017
 Eucorydia purpuralis (Kirby, W. F. 1903)
 Eucorydia tangi Qiu, Che, & Wang, 2017
 Eucorydia tokarensis Yanagisawa, Sakamaki &Shimano, 2021
 Eucorydia tristis Hanitsch 1929
 Eucorydia westwoodi (Gerstaecker 1861)
 Eucorydia xizangensis Woo & P. Feng 1988
 Eucorydia yasumatsui Asahina 1971
 Eucorydia yunnanensis Woo, Guo & P. Feng 1986

References

External links 

 
 Eucorydia at insectoid.info

Cockroach genera